James Romain (born August 6, 1987) is an American football defensive back who is currently a free agent. He played college football at Delaware State University and attended Far Rockaway High School in New York City.

Early life
Romain attended Far Rockaway High School, where he played football as a running back.

College career
Romain played for the Hudson Valley Vikings from 2005 to 2006. Romain transferred to Delaware State, where he played from 2007 to 2008. He was the team's starter his senior year and helped the Hornets to 15 wins. He played in 23 games during his career, including 11 starts at cornerback. Romain was named a 2006 Preseason All-American.

Professional career

Fairbanks Grizzlies
Romain played for the Fairbanks Grizzlies in 2011. Romain had 11 interceptions as a rookie and forced 3 fumbles, along with 3 Touchdowns earning him First Team All-IFL honors.

Green Bay Blizzard
On January 12, 2012, Romain signed with the Green Bay Blizzard. Romain had 57 tackles and 4 interceptions on the season.

Philadelphia Soul
On January 2, 2013, Romain was assigned to the Philadelphia Soul. On August 26, 2016, the Soul beat the Arizona Rattlers in ArenaBowl XXIX by a score of 56–42. He earned First Team All-Arena honors in 2017. On August 26, 2017, the Soul beat the Tampa Bay Storm in ArenaBowl XXX by a score of 44–40. With the Soul, Romain was selected as the 2018 Defensive Back of the Year.

Beijing Lions
Romain was selected by the Beijing Lions in the third round of the 2016 CAFL Draft, joining his Soul head coach Clint Dolezel in  Beijing. The Lions finished the season undefeated and won the first China Bowl. He earned All-Pro North Division All-Star honors and was named the CAFL's Steel-man for his "all around excellence at several positions". He also caught 21 passes for 217 yards and 5 touchdowns. He is listed on the Lions' roster for the 2018 season.

AFL statistics

Stats from ArenaFan:

References

External links
 Delaware State Hornets bio
 

Living people
1987 births
People from Far Rockaway, Queens
Sportspeople from Queens, New York
Players of American football from New York City
American football defensive backs
Far Rockaway High School alumni
Hudson Valley Vikings football players
Delaware State Hornets football players
Fairbanks Grizzlies players
Green Bay Blizzard players
Philadelphia Soul players
Beijing Lions players